Ngambay (also known as Sara, Sara Ngambai, Gamba, Gambaye, Gamblai and Ngambai) is one of the major languages spoken by Sara people in southwestern Chad, northeastern Cameroon and eastern Nigeria, with about a million native speakers. Ngambay is the most widely spoken of the Sara languages, and is used as a trade language between speakers of other dialects. It is spoken by the Sara Gambai people.

Ngambay has Subject–Verb–Object word order. Suffixes indicate case. There is no tense; aspect is indicated by a perfective–imperfective distinction. Modifiers follow nouns. The numeral system is decimal, but eight and nine are expressed as 10-minus-two and 10-minus-one. It is a tone language with three tones: high, mid, and low. There are loan words from both Arabic and French.

Phonology

Consonants

Vowels/Nasals 

Vowels can be accented or nasalised. Diacritics and accents include high /á/, mid /ā/, low /à/, and nasalised /ã/.

References

External links
The Sara-Bagirmi Language Project – Ngambay

Languages of Chad
Bongo–Bagirmi languages
Languages of Cameroon
Languages of Nigeria
Subject–verb–object languages
Tonal languages